Ece or ECE may refer to
 Ece, a Turkish given name and surname
 École centrale d'électronique
 Early childhood education
 Educational Credential Evaluators
 Einstein–Cartan–Evans theory
 Excelsior College Examinations, an American standardized test
 Explicit Congestion Notification Echo
 United Nations Economic Commission for Europe
EuroCity-Express, a category of trains
Edge Consumer Electronics, networks of interconnected Consumer Electronics devices